Leave Me Alone (Chinese: 忘了我吧, Pinyin: Wàngle wǒ ba) aka "Forget Me" is a single by Chinese singer-songwriter Xu Weizhou from his album "The Time". It is included in the 1st quarter of the album.

Background and release
Leave Me Alone, a pop song with a length of four minutes and five seconds is a song about break-up and letting go of the past. It is included in the 1st quarter of "The Time". The whole quarter was officially released on 10 August 2017 while the official music video was released on 21 August at several Chinese streaming sites as well as YouTube and quickly rose to charts. In September, it rose to first place on its 3rd week at Billboard China real-time chart.

Xu Weizhou performed the song live for the first time on 27 August during the 2017 Fresh Asia Music Awards.

Music video

Background
The official music video was shot in London together with a Chinese and Londoner team. Xu flew to Paris for Louis Vuitton S/S 2018 Men's Paris Fashion Week on 22 June and went to London later to shoot his music videos for "Leave Me Alone" and "So What".

Synopsis
The music video opens with Xu holding an umbrella standing on the banks of River Thames. As the song starts, Xu is seen lying on bed unmotivated. He finally got up but he is grieving i.e. crying while eating plain bread and breaking plates. As he was eating the bread, he remembered their happy times together. He saw the doll they bought and the camera they used while taking pictures of each other. He revisited the store where they bought the doll from and saw a single piece. He brought his other doll and placed it beside the lone piece. He finally threw all the pictures they took together and broke down crying. Lastly, there was a flashback scene where they had a date at the river bank. He went to that place again, as seen on the opening scene and let go of his umbrella. He smiled while leaving that place finally letting go of the past. Xu, wearing a black shirt with a black background singing along was shown between each scene.

Credits and personnel
Credits were adapted from the official music video. 
Star Power (Beijing) Culture Media Co., Ltd and Timmy Xu Studio – presentation
Geocast TV – production
Baina Entertainment – digital distribution
Lee Shih Shiong – producer
Tang Hanxiao – composer, music arrangement
Yang Jie – lyricist
A chaos – music arrangement, guitarist
Li Hao – executive producer
Yang Tian, Chen Hengxiao and Wu Yaxian – co-producers
Pan Geng – director
Liao Zhengxing – A&R
David Tan – backing vocals, backing vocals arrangement
Zhou Caoyuan, Li Chen Chen – dubbing assistant
Zhangjin – make-up & hair
Li Kunmo – stylist

Chart performance

Weekly

References

2017 songs
2017 singles